The Audie Award for History or Biography is one of the Audie Awards presented annually by the Audio Publishers Association (APA). It awards excellence in narration, production, and content for a history or biography audiobook released in a given year. Before 2015 this was given as two distinct awards, the Audie Award for Biography or Memoir (awarded since 2003; also split into the modern Audie Award for Autobiography or Memoir) and the Audie Award for History (awarded since 2009).

Winners and finalists

2010s

2020s

Biography/Memoir winners and finalists 2003–2014

2000s

2010s

History winners and finalists 2009–2014

2000s

2010s

References

External links 

 Audie Award winners
 Audie Awards official website

History or Biography
Awards established in 2000
English-language literary awards